Iesi or IESI may refer to:
 IESI-BFC Ltd.
 Jesi, Italy